Garhi Harsaru Junction railway station is a small railway station in Gurgaon district, Haryana, India. Its code is GHH. It serves Garhi Harsaru town. The station consists of two platforms. The platform is not well sheltered. It lacks many facilities including water and sanitation.

Garhi Harsaru is a main junction in Gurgaon district due to its proximity to Manesar. A branch line towards Farrukhnagar was laid in 1901 on Rajputana–Malwa Railway. For many years, the metre-gauge railway line was used to transport salt by steam engines and was closed in 2004 for gauge conversion. The converted broad-gauge track became operational in 2011. There has been a demand to extend the track to Jhajjar where it will join In 1982 shooting of famous movie "Gandhi" the station was depicted as 
Pietermaritzburg where Mahatma Gandhi was thrown out of first class compartment of being non white.
Rewari–Jhajjar–Rohtak railway line.

Garhi Harsaru is also a large inland container depot and serves as a hub for transshipment of containers from and to Mumbai Port and seaports on the west coast of India in Gujarat.

Major trains 
Some of the important trains that run from Garhi Harsaru Junction are:
 Malani Express
 Ala Hazrat Express
 Farrukhnagar–Saharanpur Janta Express
 Porbandar–Delhi Sarai Rohilla Express
 Delhi–Barmer Link Express
 Mandore Express
 Pooja Superfast Express
 Garhi Harsaru–Farukhnagar Passenger
 Ala Hazrat Express (via Bhildi)

References

Railway stations in Gurgaon district
Delhi railway division
Railway stations opened in 1901
1901 establishments in India
Railway junction stations in Haryana